Woodacre is an unincorporated town and census-designated place (CDP) in Marin County, California, United States. The population was 1,410 at the 2020 census.

Geography  
San Geronimo and Lagunitas-Forest Knolls are to its west. At , Woodacre has the highest base elevation in Marin County. 

History 
The community began when promoters subdivided the place in 1912. The first post office opened in 1925.

Demographics

2010 
The 2010 United States Census reported that Woodacre had a population of 1,348. The racial makeup of Woodacre was 1,231 (91.3%) White, 3 (0.2%) African American, 4 (0.3%) Native American, 27 (2.0%) Asian, 4 (0.3%) Pacific Islander, 10 (0.7%) from other races, and 69 (5.1%) from two or more races. Hispanic or Latino of any race were 77 persons (5.7%).

The Census reported that 100% of the population lived in households.

There were 595 households, of which 144 (24.2%) had children under the age of 18 living in them, 279 (46.9%) were opposite-sex married couples living together, 54 (9.1%) had a female householder with no husband present, 25 (4.2%) had a male householder with no wife present. There were 49 (8.2%) unmarried opposite-sex partnerships, and 11 (1.8%) same-sex married couples or partnerships. 163 households (27.4%) were made up of individuals, and 44 (7.4%) had someone living alone who was 65 years of age or older. The average household size was 2.27.  There were 358 families (60.2% of all households); the average family size was 2.72.

238 people (17.7%) were under the age of 18, 53 people (3.9%) aged 18 to 24, 262 people (19.4%) aged 25 to 44, 575 people (42.7%) aged 45 to 64, and 220 people (16.3%) who were 65 years of age or older. The median age was 50.5 years. For every 100 females there were 92.0 males. For every 100 females age 18 and over, there were 88.5 males.

The homeowner vacancy rate was 0.7%; the rental vacancy rate was 2.6%. 77.3% of the population lived in owner-occupied housing units and 22.7% lived in rental housing units.

2000 
At the 2000 census, there were 1,393 people, 548 households and 381 families residing in the CDP. The racial makeup of the CDP inj 2010 was 88.0% non-Hispanic White, 0.2% non-Hispanic African American, 0.1% Native American, 2.0% Asian, 0.3% Pacific Islander, 0.3% from other races, and 3.3% from two or more races. Hispanic or Latino of any race were 5.7% of the population.

There were 548 households, of which 34.3% had children under the age of 18 living with them, 55.3% were married couples living together, 11.3% had a female householder with no husband present, and 30.3% were non-families. 19.5% of all households were made up of individuals, and 4.4% had someone living alone who was 65 years of age or older. The average household size was 2.54 and the average family size was 2.90.

23.0% of the population were under the age of 18, 3.7% from 18 to 24, 25.8% from 25 to 44, 38.8% from 45 to 64, and 8.7% who were 65 years of age or older. The median age was 44 years. For every 100 females there were 92.1 males. For every 100 females age 18 and over, there were 88.2 males.

The median household income was $62,917 and the median family income was $71,250. Males had a median income of $50,109 compared with $40,167 for females. The per capita income for the CDP was $31,996. About 3.9% of families and 6.6% of the population were below the poverty line, including 8.4% of those under age 18 and none of those age 65 or over.

Notable people 
 Harold Jones (born 1940), drummer with Tony Bennett and Count Basie Orchestra
 Jack Kornfield (born 1945), founded Spirit Rock Meditation Center in Woodacre in 1987
 Victor Moscoso (born 1936), known primarily for psychedelic posters and Zap Comix
 Gage Taylor (1942–2000), artist known for his psychedelic-inspired landscapes
 Robin Williams (1951–2014), actor; lived in Woodacre as a teenager
 William Windom (1923–2012), actor; retired to Woodacre and died there in 2012

References 

Census-designated places in Marin County, California
Populated places established in 1912
1912 establishments in California
West Marin